Joe Smith (born Salvatore Joseph Smith) (December 29, 1893 – January 12, 1974) was a  Major League Baseball catcher. Smith played for the New York Yankees in the  season. In 14 career games, he had five hits, two RBIs and a .156 batting average. He batted and threw right-handed.

Smith was born in New York, New York, and died in Yonkers, New York.

External links

New York Yankees players
Major League Baseball catchers
Baseball players from New York (state)
California Golden Bears baseball players
Minor league baseball managers
Bridgeport Americans players
Bridgeport Bears (baseball) players
New Haven Profs players
Worcester Panthers players
Providence Rubes players
Pittsfield Hillies players
Providence Grays (minor league) players
Hartford Senators players
Albany Senators players
Springfield Ponies players
New Haven Bulldogs players
Oakland Oaks (baseball) players
1893 births
1974 deaths